Marano may refer to:

People 
 Marano (surname), a surname of Italian origin
Adam Marano, American music producer of T.P.E. Featuring Adam Marano
Cindy Marano (1947-2005), American economist
Kristie Marano (born 1979), American wrestler
Laura Marano (born 1995), American teen actress and singer
Vanessa Marano (born 1992), American actress

Places

Municipalities 
Marano di Napoli, in the Province of Naples, Campania
Marano di Valpolicella, in the Province of Verona, Veneto
Marano Equo, in the Province of Rome, Lazio
Marano Lagunare, in the Province of Udine, Friuli-Venezia Giulia
Marano Marchesato, in the Province of Cosenza, Calabria
Marano Principato, in the Province of Cosenza, Calabria
Marano sul Panaro, in the Province of Modena, Emilia-Romagna
Marano Ticino, in the Province of Novara, Piedmont
Marano Vicentino, in the Province of Vicenza, Veneto

Hamlets 
Marano (Castenaso), in the municipality of Castenaso (BO), Emilia-Romagna
Marano (Isera), in the municipality of Isera (TN), Trentino-South Tyrol
Marano (Parma), in the municipality of Parma, Emilia-Romagna
Marano Veneziano, in the municipality of Mira, Veneto

Rivers of Italy and San Marino 
Marano (river), in Emilia–Romagna and San Marino
Marano di Reno, in Emilia-Romagna

See also
Marana (disambiguation)
Merano (disambiguation)
Marrano, an ancient term referring to Jews living in the Iberian Peninsula
Marani (disambiguation)